Simone Drexel (born 13 May 1957 in St. Gallen) is a Swiss singer and songwriter. 

In 1975 she represented Switzerland in the Eurovision Song Contest with her self penned entry Mikado which finished sixth on the night. In 1984, following the birth of her daughter, Drexel retired from the music industry and a year later she started working in Transfusion medicine

In recent years Drexel has returned to the music industry as a music teacher, she is also the lead singer of the group Bluesonix.

External links
 Bluesonix – official Website
Video Eurovision in Stockholm 1975 Mikado

1957 births
People from St. Gallen (city)
Living people
Swiss singer-songwriters
Eurovision Song Contest entrants for Switzerland
Eurovision Song Contest entrants of 1975